The Indian Imperial Police, referred to variously as the Indian Police or, by 1905, the Imperial Police, was part of the Indian Police Services, the uniform system of police administration in British India, as established by Government of India Act 1858 and Police Act of 1861. It was motivated by the danger experienced by the British during the 1857 rebellion.

During 1920 the Imperial Indian police had 310,000 police in their contingent. Its members policed more than 300 million people in India, Pakistan, Bangladesh and Burma (then comprising the British Raj).

In 1948, a year after India's independence, the Imperial Police Service was replaced by the Indian Police Service, which had been constituted as part of the All-India Services by the Constitution.

History
It comprised two branches, the Superior Police Services, from which the Indian (Imperial) Police would later be formed, and the Subordinate Police Service. Until 1893, appointments to the senior grades (i.e., Assistant District Superintendent and above) were made locally in India, mainly from European officers of the Indian Army.

The highest rank in the service was the Inspector General for each province. The rank of Inspector General was equated and ranked with Brigadier and similar ranks in the Indian Armed Forces, as per Central Warrant of Precedence in 1937. Subordinate to the Inspector General, the ranks were composed of District Superintendents and Assistant District Superintendents, most of whom were appointed, from 1893, by examination for the Indian Civil Service tests in the UK. The Subordinate Police Service consisted of Inspectors, Sub-Inspectors, Head Constables (or Sergeant in the City forces and cantonments) and Constables, consisting mainly of Indians except for the higher ranks.

By the 1930s, the Indian Police exercised "unprecedented degree of authority within the colonial administration". The Indian Imperial Police was also the primary law enforcement in Burma, governed as a province of India, until 1937.

Ranks of the Imperial (India) Police
 Superior Services:
 Inspector General of Police (Head of the state police)
 Deputy Inspector General of Police (Head of Range Police) or Commissioner of Four cities (Madras, Bombay, Calcutta and Rangoon)
 Superintendent of Police (Head of District Police)
 Assistant Superintendent of Police (Head of sub divisional Police, specially main sub division of a district)
 Sub-ordinate services:
 Deputy Superintendent of Police (Head of sub divisional Police).
 Inspector of Police (Head of circle Police)
 Sub Inspector of Police (Head of Police station)
 Sergeant (One for each police station and should be European or Anglo-Indian)
 Head constable
 Naik
 Constable

Orwell
George Orwell, with his real name Eric Blair, served in the Indian Imperial Police, in Burma, from 27 November 1922 to 12 July 1927, formally resigning while on leave in England (effective 1 January 1928) having attained the rank of Assistant District Superintendent at District Headquarters, first in Insein, and later at Moulmein. He wrote of how having been in contact with, in his own words, "the dirty work of Empire at close quarters" had affected his personal, political and social opinions. Some of his works referring to his experiences include "A Hanging" (1931), set in the notorious Insein Prison, and his novel Burmese Days (1934). Likewise, although he wrote that, "I loved Burma and the Burman and have no regrets that I spent the best years of my life in the Burma police.", in "Shooting an Elephant" (1936), he stated that "In Moulmein in Lower Burma, I was hated by large numbers of people–- the only time in my life that I have been important enough for this to happen to me."

See also
 T. Ramachandra Rao
 Panchanan Ghoshal
 Qazi Azizul Haque

References

Notes

Bibliography
Chandavarkar, Rajnarayan (1998) Imperial Power and Popular Politics: Class, Resistance and the State in India, 1850-1950. Cambridge University Press. At Google Books.

History of law enforcement in India
Government of British India